Béjaïa District is a district of Béjaïa Province, Algeria.

Municipalities
The district is further divided into 2 municipalities:
Béjaïa
Oued Ghir

References

Districts of Béjaïa Province